The 1968 United States presidential election in Pennsylvania took place on November 5, 1968, and was part of the 1968 United States presidential election. Voters chose 29 representatives, or electors to the Electoral College, who voted for president and vice president.

Pennsylvania voted for the Democratic nominee, Vice President Hubert Humphrey, over the Republican nominee, former Vice President Richard Nixon. Humphrey won Pennsylvania by a margin of 3.57%. A third-party candidate, former Alabama Governor George Wallace, played a significant role by winning 7.97% of the vote. This marked the first time since 1948 that a losing presidential candidate carried Pennsylvania, and the first time ever that the candidate was a Democrat. It would happen again only two more times, in George W. Bush's elections in 2000 and 2004, although the state voted for the popular-vote winner in 2000.

Results

Results by county

See also
 List of United States presidential elections in Pennsylvania

Notes

References

Pennsylvania
1968
1968 Pennsylvania elections